Gizalki may refer to the following places in Poland:

Gizałki, Greater Poland Voivodeship
Giżałki, West Pomeranian Voivodeship